is a prefecture of Japan located on the island of Kyūshū. Fukuoka Prefecture has a population of 5,109,323 (1 June 2019) and has a geographic area of 4,986 km2 (1,925 sq mi). Fukuoka Prefecture borders Saga Prefecture to the southwest, Kumamoto Prefecture to the south, and Ōita Prefecture to the southeast.

Fukuoka is the capital and largest city of Fukuoka Prefecture, and the largest city on Kyūshū, with other major cities including Kitakyushu, Kurume, and Ōmuta. Fukuoka Prefecture is located at the northernmost point of Kyūshū on the Kanmon Straits, connecting the Tsushima Strait and the Seto Inland Sea across from Yamaguchi Prefecture on the island of Honshu, and extends south towards the Ariake Sea.

History

Fukuoka Prefecture includes the former provinces of Chikugo, Chikuzen, and Buzen.

Shrines and temples

Kōra taisha, Sumiyoshi-jinja, and Hakozaki-gū are the chief Shinto shrines (ichinomiya) in the prefecture.

Geography

Fukuoka Prefecture faces the sea on three sides, bordering Saga, Ōita, and Kumamoto prefectures and facing Yamaguchi Prefecture across the Kanmon Straits.

As of 1 April 2012, 18% of the land area of the prefecture was designated as natural parks: Setonaikai National Park, Genkai, Kitakyūshū, and Yaba-Hita-Hikosan quasi-national parks, and Chikugogawa, Chikuhō, Dazaifu, Sefuri Raizan, and Yabegawa Prefectural Natural Parks.

Fukuoka includes the two largest cities on Kyūshū, Fukuoka and Kitakyushu, and much of Kyūshū's industry. It also includes a number of small islands near the north coast of Kyūshū.

Cities

Twenty-nine cities are in Fukuoka Prefecture:

Asakura
Buzen
Chikugo
Chikushino
Dazaifu
Fukuoka (capital)
Fukutsu
Iizuka
Itoshima
Kama
Kasuga
Kitakyūshū
Koga
Kurume
Miyama
Miyawaka
Munakata
Nakagawa
Nakama
Nōgata
Ogōri
Ōkawa
Ōmuta
Ōnojō
Tagawa
Ukiha
Yame
Yanagawa
Yukuhashi

Towns and villages
These are the towns and villages in each district:

Asakura District
Chikuzen
Tōhō
Chikujō District
Chikujō
Kōge
Yoshitomi
Kaho District
Keisen
Kasuya District
Hisayama
Kasuya
Sasaguri
Shime
Shingū
Sue
Umi
Kurate District
Kotake
Kurate
Mii District
Tachiarai
Miyako District
Kanda
Miyako
Mizuma District
Ōki
Onga District
Ashiya
Mizumaki
Okagaki
Onga
Tagawa District
Aka
Fukuchi
Itoda
Kawara
Kawasaki
Ōtō
Soeda
Yame District
Hirokawa

Mergers

Economy
Fukuoka prefecture's main cities form one of Japan's main industrial centers, accounting for nearly 40% of the economy of Kyūshū. Major industries include automobiles, semiconductors, and steel. Fukuoka prefecture is where tire manufacturer Bridgestone and consumer electronics chain Best Denki were founded.

Universities
One of Japan's top 5 universities, Kyushu University, is located in Fukuoka.

Demographics

According to October 2018 estimates, the population in Fukuoka Prefecture reached 5,111,494 inhabitants, making the prefecture the 9th most populated of Japan's 47 prefectures. It is one of the few prefectures with a steadily increasing population.

Culture

Fukuoka Art Museum – In Ohori Park; contains a wide selection of contemporary and other art from around the world
Fukuoka Asian Art Museum – contains art from Asia
Fukuoka City Museum – displays a broad range of items from the region's history, including a spectacular gold seal
Hakata Machiya Folk Museum – Dedicated to displaying the traditional ways of life, speech, and culture of the Fukuoka region
Fukuoka Castle – a castle in Chūō-ku, Fukuoka
Hakata Gion Yamakasa – Japanese festival celebrated 1–15 July
Ōhori Park – a registered Place of Scenic Beauty
Kyushu National Museum – The collections cover the history of Kyūshū from prehistory to the Meiji era with particular emphasis on the rich history of cultural exchange between Kyūshū and neighboring China and Korea
HKT48 Theater – where the idol group HKT48 performs every day
LinQ – the Kyushu idol group meaning "Love in Kyushu", local theater where the LinQ performs weekly on Saturday and Sunday in Tenjin Best Hall
Bairin-ji – Rinzai temple and garden in Kurume

Major events and festivals
Hakata Dontaku Harbour Festival, Tenjin, Fukuoka on May 3 and 4
Hakata Gion Yamagasa, Kushida Shrine, Fukuoka in July
Kokura Gion Yamagasa, Kitakyushu in July 
Tobata Gion Yamagasa, Kitakyushu in July 
Kurosaki Gion Yamagasa, Kitakyushu in July
Kitahara Hakushu Festival, Yanagawa on November 1 to 3

Sports

The sports teams listed below are based in Fukuoka.

Football (soccer)
Avispa Fukuoka (Fukuoka City)
Giravanz Kitakyushu (Kitakyūshū City)
Fukuoka J. Anclas

Baseball
Fukuoka SoftBank Hawks (Fukuoka City)

Basketball
Rizing Zephyr Fukuoka (Fukuoka City)

Rugby
Coca-Cola Red Sparks (Fukuoka City)
Fukuoka Sanix Blues (Munakata)
Kyuden Voltex
Sanix World Rugby Youth Tournament

The prefecture hosts the Fukuoka International Cross Country competition.  The prefecture also hosted the Fukuoka Marathon, which was an elite marathon in which marathon world records were established twice during its 75 year existence. Its final race took place in 2021.

Crime and safety
Fukuoka Prefecture has the most designated yakuza groups among all of the prefectures, at five: the Kudo-kai, the Taishu-kai, the Fukuhaku-kai, the Dojin-kai and the Kyushu Seido-kai. Between 2004 and 2009, and in early 2011, Fukuoka Prefecture led the nation in gun-related incidents. These incidents were mostly related to the local yakuza syndicates, specifically the Kudo-kai, the Dojin-kai, and the Kyushu Seido-kai.

Fukuoka Prefecture had the highest frequency of youth crime among the prefectures of Japan from 2003 to 2007.

According to statistics from the national police, the crime rate in Fukuoka was the eighth-highest in 2017, lower than in Osaka, Tokyo, Hyogo, Aichi, Saitama, Chiba and Ibaraki.

Tourism

The most popular place for tourism is Fukuoka City, especially during the Dontaku festival, which attracts millions of visitors from across Japan during Golden Week. Fukuoka is the main shopping, dining, transportation and entertainment hub in Kyushu.

Dazaifu is popular for its many temples and historical sites, as well as the Kyushu National Museum.

Yanagawa is sometimes called "the Venice of Japan" for its boat tours on the abundant, calm rivers that wind through the city.

Kitakyushu features one of the famous night views of Japan from atop Mt. Sarakura, accessible via cablecar. The Mojiko area features waterfront dining, a market, and several preserved historical buildings. The Kanmon Kaikyo Tunnel which connects Kyushu (Moji ward, Kitakyushu) and Honshu (Shimonoseki) is free to walk through. The city center in Kokurakita ward contains the Riverwalk and Itsutsuya shopping complexes, Kokura castle, and the Uomachi Gintengai shopping arcade, the oldest shopping arcade in Japan.

Transportation

Railway services

West Japan Railway Company(=JR Nishinihon)
Sanyō Shinkansen
Hakata Minami Line
JR Kyushu
Kyūshū Shinkansen, Kagoshima Main Line, Chikuhō Main Line, Nippō Main Line, Kyudai Main Line
Chikuhi Line, Gotōji Line, Kashii Line, Hitahikosan Line, Sasaguri Line
Nishi-Nippon Railroad
Tenjin Ōmuta Line, Dazaifu Line, Nishitetsu Amagi Line, Kaizuka Line
Amagi Railway
Amagi Railway Amagi Line
Heisei Chikuhō Railway
Ita Line, Itota Line, Tagawa Line
Coto Coto Train
Fukuoka City Subway
Kūkō Line, Hakozaki Line, Nanakuma Line
Kitakyushu Monorail

Airports
Fukuoka Airport
New Kitakyushu airport

Sister regions
 Hawaii, United States
 Jiangsu Province, People's Republic of China
 Delhi, India
 Bangkok, Thailand
 Hanoi, Vietnam

Citations

General references
 Nussbaum, Louis-Frédéric and Käthe Roth (2005). Japan Encyclopedia. Cambridge: Harvard University Press. ; .

External links

 
 
 
 Fukuoka map (1891) – National Archives of Japan

 
Kyushu region
Prefectures of Japan